Down and Dirty is the debut album by American rap group The Click, released in 1992 on Sick Wid It Records. It peaked at number 87 on the Billboard Top R&B/Hip-Hop Albums chart.

In 1994, Sick Wid' It released it on CD, but with two of the 16 tracks missing. Jive records reissued Down and Dirty in 1995 on CD, although with several tracks remixed or missing from the original version.

A music video was produced for the song, "Tired of Being Stepped On", featuring Levitti and features a cameo appearance by C-Bo.

Original version (1992)
Original Sick Wid It Records version, released in 1992 on LP, CD and cassette.

Track listing
"Lets Get Drunk" - 5:26
"On a Mission" - 4:21
"Ballers" (featuring Mugzi) - 1:09
"Street Life" (featuring Kaveo & Mugzi) - 5:04
"Mic Check" - 3:59
"Mr. Flamboyant" - 6:22
"Tramp Dogs" - 5:19
"Old School" (featuring Little Bruce) - 4:47
"The !!!! That Will Mess Up Your Brain" - 4:54
"She Was Only 16" - 4:50
"Tired of Being Stepped On" (featuring Levitti) - 5:07
"Sohabs" - 3:35
"Daily Routine" - 3:59
"Clicks Concert" - 0:33
"Porno Star" (featuring Kaveo) - 3:27
"Party in the V-Town" - 4:13
"You !!!! Up When You Slammed My Motha" - 4:24
"Lets Side" - 4:48

Reissue (1995)
Reissued Jive Records version, released in 1995 on CD and cassette. Seven of the eighteen tracks from the original tape were omitted completely and five were remixed, leaving just six cuts, in their original form.

Track listing
"Let's Get Drunk" - 5:17
"On A Mission" - 4:06
"Life" - 4:56
"Mic Check" - 3:51
"Mr. Flamboyant" - 6:00
"Tramp Dogs" - 5:08
"Old School" (featuring Little Bruce) - 5:01
"The Shit That Will Fuck With Your Brain Boy" - 5:02
"She's Was Only 16" - 4:29
"Tired Of Being Stepped On" (featuring Levitti) - 5:00
"Click's Concert" - 0:21

Samples
Daily Routine
"Use Me" by Bill Withers

Chart history

References

External links
 Down and Dirty at Discogs
 Down and Dirty at MusicBrainz
 Down and Dirty (1995 reissue) at Discogs

1992 debut albums
B-Legit albums
E-40 albums
Jive Records albums
Self-released albums
Sick Wid It Records albums
The Click albums
Albums produced by Studio Ton